The Laonong River, also spelled Laonung River, is a tributary of the Gaoping River in Taiwan; it is the main course of the river system above the Gaoping River. It flows through Kaohsiung City for 136 km.

See also
List of rivers in Taiwan

References

External links

Photos

Rivers of Taiwan
Landforms of Kaohsiung